The 2018 AFC Champions League was the 37th edition of Asia's premier club football tournament organized by the Asian Football Confederation (AFC), and the 16th under the current AFC Champions League title.

Kashima Antlers won the title for the first time, defeating Persepolis in the final, and qualified as the AFC representative at the 2018 FIFA Club World Cup in the United Arab Emirates.

Urawa Red Diamonds were the title holders, but they were unable to defend their title as they finished seventh in the 2017 J1 League and were eliminated in the fourth round of the 2017 Emperor's Cup, thus did not qualify for the tournament. It marked the second season in a row without title holders after Jeonbuk Hyundai Motors were disqualified in 2017 as a result of their involvement in a match-fixing scandal in 2016.

Association team allocation
The AFC Competitions Committee proposed a revamp of the AFC club competitions on 25 January 2014, which was ratified by the AFC Executive Committee on 16 April 2014. The 46 AFC member associations (excluding the associate member Northern Mariana Islands) are ranked based on their national team's and clubs' performance over the last four years in AFC competitions, with the allocation of slots for the 2017 and 2018 editions of the AFC club competitions determined by the 2016 AFC rankings (Entry Manual Article 2.2):
The associations were split into two regions:
West Region consists of the associations from the West Asian Football Federation (WAFF), the Central Asian Football Association (CAFA), and the South Asian Football Federation (SAFF).
East Region consists of the associations from the ASEAN Football Federation (AFF) and the East Asian Football Federation (EAFF).
In each region, there are four groups in the group stage, including a total of 12 direct slots, with the 4 remaining slots filled through play-offs.
The top 12 associations in each region as per the AFC rankings are eligible to enter the AFC Champions League, as long as they fulfill the AFC Champions League criteria.
The top six associations in each region get at least one direct slot in the group stage, while the remaining associations get only play-off slots (as well as AFC Cup group stage slots):
The associations ranked 1st and 2nd each get three direct slots and one play-off slot.
The associations ranked 3rd and 4th each get two direct slots and two play-off slots.
The associations ranked 5th each get one direct slot and two play-off slots.
The associations ranked 6th each get one direct slot and one play-off slot.
The associations ranked 7th to 12th each get one play-off slot.
The maximum number of slots for each association is one-third of the total number of eligible teams in the top division.
If any association gives up its direct slots, they are redistributed to the highest eligible association, with each association limited to a maximum of three direct slots.
If any association gives up its play-off slots, they are annulled and not redistributed to any other association.

For the 2018 AFC Champions League, the associations are allocated slots according to their association ranking published on 30 November 2016, which takes into account their performance in the AFC Champions League and the AFC Cup, as well as their national team's FIFA World Rankings, during the period between 2013 and 2016.

Notes

Teams
The following 46 teams from 20 associations entered the competition.

In the following table, the number of appearances and last appearance count only those since the 2002–03 season (including qualifying rounds), when the competition was rebranded as the AFC Champions League.

Notes

Schedule
The schedule of the competition was as follows.

Qualifying play-offs

Preliminary round 1

Preliminary round 2

Play-off round

Group stage

Group A

Group B

Group C

Group D

Group E

Group F

Group G

Group H

Knockout stage

Bracket

Round of 16

Quarter-finals

Semi-finals

Final

Awards

Main awards

All-Star Squad 
Source:

Opta Best XI 
Source:

Fans' Best XI 
Source:

Top scorers

Player of the week awards

See also
2018 AFC Cup
2018 FIFA Club World Cup

References

External links
, the-AFC.com
AFC Champions League 2018, stats.the-AFC.com

 
2018 in Asian football
2017